FC Zoria Khorostkiv was an amateur Ukrainian football club from Khorostkiv, Chortkiv Raion, Ternopil Oblast. The head coach of the senior team was Vyacheslav Kshevitsky. 

The club participated in regional competitions during the Soviet period. In 2006 Zoria was dissolved.

In 1995–96 Zoria Khorostkiv won a group of the Amateur Championship of Ukraine. It also won the 1997–98 Ukrainian Amateur Cup.

References

Football clubs in Khorostkiv
Defunct football clubs in Ukraine
Association football clubs established in 1970
Association football clubs disestablished in 2006
1970 establishments in Ukraine
2006 disestablishments in Ukraine